Moine, French for "monk", may refer to:
 A' Mhòine, a peninsula in northern Scotland
 Le Moine, a mountain of the Pennine Alps
 La Moine River, a tributary of the Illinois River in western Illinois in the United States
 Moine Thrust Belt, a major geological feature in the north-west of Scotland
 Moine Supergroup, metamorphic rocks that form the dominant outcrop of the Scottish Highlands

People with the surname
 Antonin Moine (1796–1849), French sculptor
 Claude Moine or Eddy Mitchell (born 1942), French singer and actor
 Jean-Jacques Moine (born 1954), French swimmer
 Mario Moine (born 1949), Argentine politician
 Michel Moine (1920–2005), French journalist and parapsychologist
 Roger Moine, an SC Bastia player

See also
 Des Moines, Iowa
 Tête de Moine a Swiss cheese
 Lemoine, a surname
 Moina (disambiguation)